Renaissance Plaza (formerly named World Trade Square) is a proposed residential and retail complex to be built on a  site in the Delaware Riverfront region of Philadelphia, Pennsylvania. The previous World Trade Square complex design was to be developed by Carl Marks Real Estate Group and called for four high-rise office buildings: Old City Harbor Tower I, Old City Harbor Tower II, Old City Harbor Tower III, and the Greater Philadelphia World Trade Center. The tallest buildings would have been the Old City Harbor Towers II and III, which were planned as twin office skyscrapers that each rise 636 feet (194 m), with 37 floors. Old City Harbor Tower I was being planned as a residential tower, rising 435 ft (132 m), with 42 floors. The Greater Philadelphia World Trade Center would have been the shortest of all four buildings, rising 324 ft (99 m), with 17 floors.

In 2012, the plan was revised by Waterfront Renaissance Associates as 1,458-unit residential tower complex, with two taller 435 ft towers and two shorter 435 ft towers. The development would have violated the 100 foot height limit imposed by the Delaware River Waterfront Corporation in their master plan. In response to height concerns, the plan was revised in July 2013 to lower the height of the tallest tower to 240 feet and build five towers instead of four.

The architectural firm who designed all four buildings is Alesker & Dundon Architects, and the project is being developed by Waterfront Renaissance Associates.

See also

 List of tallest buildings in Philadelphia

References

External links
 Project site
 Emporis

Skyscrapers in Philadelphia
Proposed skyscrapers in the United States
Square